The Damagers, published in 1993, is a spy novel by Donald Hamilton, and the twenty-seventh volume of the adventures of government assassin Matt Helm. Hamilton had launched the series in 1960 with Death of a Citizen and this novel is a sequel to the second Helm book, The Wrecking Crew, also from 1960.

The Damagers is, to date, the final Matt Helm novel to be published. Hamilton did complete a twenty-eighth novel, The Dominators in 2002 (he died in 2006), but as of 2015 this book remains unpublished.

Plot summary
Matt Helm brings his literary career to a close (for now) with a double assignment: destroy a crime gang run by the son of the villain from The Wrecking Crew, and prevent the atomic destruction of Norfolk, Virginia.

External links
Synopsis and summary

1993 American novels
Matt Helm novels